A Partridge Family Christmas Card is a Christmas album (and the fourth studio album) by the Partridge Family, released in November 1971. The album's case contains a reproduction of a Christmas card signed by the whole Partridge Family, the stars of a 1970s sitcom. The song "My Christmas Card to You" was original, but the remainder of the tracks were standards.  Like most of the Partridge Family songs, the lead vocals are sung by David Cassidy, who played Keith Partridge in the show.  The album also features one of the few Partridge Family recordings featuring Shirley Jones as the lead singer ("The Christmas Song").

A Partridge Family Christmas Card was the best-selling Christmas album in the United States during the Christmas season of 1971.  It was the number 1 album on Billboard magazine's special Christmas Albums sales chart for all four weeks that the magazine published the chart that year.

The album was reissued in 1992 on CD and is also available as mp3 downloads.

Track listing
Only two tracks, "Winter Wonderland" and "Have Yourself a Merry Little Christmas", were featured on the TV show (in the second-season episode "Don't Bring Your Guns to Town, Santa")

Track listing

Personnel
Dennis Budimir, Louie Shelton - guitar
Max Bennett - bass
Mike Melvoin - piano
Hal Blaine - drums
Jackie Ward, John Bahler, Ron Hicklin, Tom Bahler - background vocals
Wes Farrell - arrangement of rhythm tracks
John Bahler - arrangement of vocal background

Track list and credits verified from the album's liner notes.

Recording dates

August 25, 1971
"White Christmas"
"Santa Claus Is Coming to Town"

August 26, 1971
"Blue Christmas"
"Jingle Bells"
"Rockin' Around the Christmas Tree"
"Winter Wonderland"
"Frosty the Snowman"

August 28, 1971
"My Christmas Card to You"
"The Christmas Song"
"Sleigh Ride"
"Have Yourself a Merry Little Christmas"

See recording dates for this and other Partridge Family albums at The Partridge Family Recording Sessions

Charts

References

The Partridge Family albums
1971 Christmas albums
Christmas albums by American artists
Albums produced by Wes Farrell
Albums recorded at United Western Recorders
Bell Records albums
Pop Christmas albums